Clarence Williams (January 25, 1955 – September 18, 1994) was an American football running back in the National Football League for the San Diego Chargers and Washington Redskins.  He played college football at the University of South Carolina and was drafted in the fifth round of the 1977 NFL Draft. On September 16, 1979, Williams rushed for 4 touchdowns for the San Diego Chargers in a win over the Buffalo Bills, a franchise record he shares with LaDainian Tomlinson.

College career
While attending South Carolina, Williams lettered in football in 1975-76 and rushed for 2,311 career yards, including eight 100-yard games.  He was inducted into the University of South Carolina Athletic Hall of Fame in 2008.

Death
On September 17, 1994, Williams was shot in his car while at an intersection.  He died at Richland Memorial Hospital in Columbia, South Carolina the following day.

References

1955 births
1994 deaths
People from Berkeley County, South Carolina
American football running backs
South Carolina Gamecocks football players
San Diego Chargers players
Washington Redskins players